In fluid dynamics, the Falkner–Skan boundary layer (named after V. M. Falkner and Sylvia W. Skan) describes the steady two-dimensional laminar boundary layer that forms on a wedge, i.e. flows in which the plate is not parallel to the flow. It is also representative of flow on a flat plate with an imposed pressure gradient along the plate length, a situation often encountered in wind tunnel flow.  It is a generalization of the flat plate Blasius boundary layer in which the pressure gradient along the plate is zero.

Prandtl's boundary layer equations

The basis of the Falkner-Skan approach are the Prandtl boundary layer equations.  Ludwig Prandtl  simplified the equations for fluid flowing along a wall (wedge) by dividing the flow into two areas: one close to the wall dominated by viscosity, and one outside this near-wall boundary layer region where viscosity can be neglected without significant effects on the solution. This means that about half of the terms in the Navier-Stokes equations are negligible in near-wall boundary layer flows (except in a small region near the leading edge of the plate). This reduced set of equations are known as the Prandtl boundary layer equations. For steady incompressible flow with constant viscosity and density, these read:

Mass Continuity: 

-Momentum: 

-Momentum: 

  
A number of similarity solutions to these equations have been found for various types of flow. Falkner and Skan developed the similarity solution for the case of laminar flow along a wedge in 1930. The term similarity refers to the property that the velocity profiles at different positions in the flow look similar apart from scaling factors in the boundary layer thickness and a characteristic boundary layer velocity. These scaling factors reduce the partial differential equations to a set of relatively easily solved set of ordinary differential equations.

Falkner–Skan equation - First order boundary layer

Falkner and Skan's first key assumption was that the pressure gradient term in the Prandtl x-momentum equation could be replaced by the differential form of the Bernoulli equation in the high Reynolds number limit. Thus: 

Here  is the velocity of at the boundary layer edge and is the solution the Euler equations (fluid dynamics) in the outer region.

Having made the Bernoulli equation substitution, Falkner and Skan pointed out that similarity solutions are obtained when the boundary layer thickness and velocity scaling factors are assumed to be simple power functions of x.  That is, they assumed the velocity similarity scaling factor is given by:

  

where  is the wedge length and m is a dimensionless constant.  Falkner and Skan also assumed the boundary layer thickness scaling factor is porpotional to:   

 

Mass conservation is automatically ensured when the Prandtl momentum boundary layer equations are solved using a stream function approach.  The stream function, in terms of the scaling factors, is given by: 

where  and the velocities are given by:

This means

The non-dimensionalized Prandtl x-momentum equation using the similarity length and velocity scaling factors together with the stream function based velocities results in an equation known as the Falkner–Skan equation and is given by:

This changes f and its derivatives but ultimately results in the same backed-out  and  solutions). This equation can be solved for certain  as an ODE with boundary conditions:

The wedge angle, after some manipulation, is given by:

 

The  case corresponds to the Blasius boundary layer solution. When , the problem reduces to the Hiemenz flow. Here, m < 0 corresponds to an adverse pressure gradient (often resulting in boundary layer separation) while m > 0 represents a favorable pressure gradient. In 1937 Douglas Hartree showed that physical solutions to the Falkner–Skan equation exist only in the range . For more negative values of m, that is, for stronger adverse pressure gradients, all solutions satisfying the boundary conditions at η = 0 have the property that f(η) > 1 for a range of values of η. This is physically unacceptable because it implies that the velocity in the boundary layer is greater than in the main flow. Further details may be found in Wilcox (2007).

With the solution for f and its derivatives in hand, the Falkner and Skan velocities become:

and

The Prandtl -momentum equation can be rearranged to obtain the -pressure gradient, /, (this is the formula appropriate for the =1 and =2m/(m+1) case) as

where the displacement thickness, for the Falkner-Skan profile is given by:

and the shear stress acting at the wedge is given by

Compressible Falkner–Skan boundary layer

Here Falkner–Skan boundary layer with a specified specific enthalpy  at the wall is studied. The density , viscosity  and thermal conductivity  are no longer constant here. In the low Mach number approximation, the equation for conservation of mass, momentum and energy become

where  is the Prandtl number with suffix  representing properties evaluated at infinity. The boundary conditions become

,
.

Unlike the incompressible boundary layer, similarity solution can exists for only if the transformation

holds and this is possible only if .

Howarth transformation

Introducing the self-similar variables using Howarth–Dorodnitsyn transformation

the equations reduce to 

The equation can be solved once  are specified. The boundary conditions are

If  is constant, then .

See also

Blasius boundary layer

References

Boundary layers
Fluid dynamics